The canton of Domfront en Poiraie (before March 2020: canton of Domfront) is an administrative division of the Orne department, northwestern France. Its borders were modified at the French canton reorganisation which came into effect in March 2015. Its seat is in Domfront en Poiraie.

It consists of the following communes:
 
Avrilly
Champsecret
Chanu
Domfront en Poiraie
Lonlay-l'Abbaye
Le Ménil-Ciboult
Montsecret-Clairefougère
Saint-Bômer-les-Forges
Saint-Brice
Saint-Christophe-de-Chaulieu
Saint-Gilles-des-Marais
Saint-Quentin-les-Chardonnets
Tinchebray-Bocage

References

Cantons of Orne